Zir Tang-e Khayyat (also Romanized as Zīr Tang-e Khayyāṭ; also known as Zīr Tang) is a village in Firuzabad Rural District, Firuzabad District, Selseleh County, Lorestan Province, Iran. At the 2006 census, its population was 245, in 47 families.

References 

Towns and villages in Selseleh County